Hogna radiata is a species of wolf spider present in South Europe (from the middle of France), north Africa and Central Asia (N. I. Platnick). This species is wandering, hunting smaller insects less than 20% of its own size. Found on grass, parks, and forests.

References

Sources 
 (fr) n°1
 (fr) n°2
 (pt) n⁰3

Spiders of Europe
Spiders described in 1817
Spiders of Africa
Spiders of Asia
Lycosidae